Prunus mongolica (the Mongolian almond) is a species of Prunus native to China and Mongolia, particularly the Gobi Desert. A small scrubby bush, reaching 1-2m, it is adapted to extreme drought. Genetic studies have shown that it is more closely related to the peaches, with its closest relative being Prunus tangutica.

References 

mongolica
Flora of Russia
Flora of Mongolia
Flora of Inner Mongolia
Flora of North-Central China
Plants described in 1879